The Jyväskylä City Theatre (Finnish: Jyväskylän kaupunginteatteri), founded in 1961, is the municipal theatre of the city of Jyväskylä, Finland.

Overview
The theatre comprises two stages: the main auditorium seats 551 spectators, the smaller studio one  100.

Annually approximately 60,000 people visit the theatre, to see around 250 performances.

The Jyväskylä Sinfonia symphony orchestra uses the theatre as their main performance venue.

Architecture
Having been founded two decades earlier, the theatre moved to its current premises in 1982. The present building is notable for having been designed by the Finnish architect Alvar Aalto.

References

External links

Theatres in Finland
Buildings and structures in Jyväskylä
Buildings and structures in Central Finland
Alvar Aalto buildings
Modernist architecture in Finland
Theatres completed in 1982
Jyväskylä